Jubobaraye Joshua Kio (born 7 September 1957) is a Nigerian athlete. He competed in the men's long jump at the 1980 Summer Olympics and the 1984 Summer Olympics.

References

1957 births
Living people
Athletes (track and field) at the 1980 Summer Olympics
Athletes (track and field) at the 1984 Summer Olympics
Nigerian male long jumpers
Olympic athletes of Nigeria
Place of birth missing (living people)
20th-century Nigerian people